The 4th Wisconsin Cavalry Regiment was a volunteer cavalry regiment that served in the Union Army during the American Civil War.  Earlier in the war, it had been organized as the 4th Wisconsin Infantry Regiment.

Service
The 4th Wisconsin Cavalry was originally organized as the 4th Wisconsin Infantry Regiment at Racine, Wisconsin, on July 2, 1861.  The regiment was redesignated the 4th Wisconsin Cavalry Regiment on August 22, 1863.

The regiment mustered out of Federal service at Brownsville, Texas, on May 2, 1866, and disbanded at Madison, Wisconsin, on June 19, 1866.

Total strength and casualties
The 4th Wisconsin Cavalry initially recruited 1,047 officers and men.  An additional 998 men were recruited as replacements, for a total of 2,045 men.

The regiment suffered 11 officers and 106 enlisted men killed or died from wounds in action, and 3 officers and 311 enlisted men who died of disease, for a total of 431 fatalities.

Commanders
 Colonel Frederick A. Boardman (August 22, 1863May 3, 1864) was killed in action at Comite River, Louisiana.  He had begun the war as major of the 4th Wisconsin Infantry Regiment and was promoted to Colonel after the death of Colonel Sidney Bean.
 Colonel Joseph Bailey (May 3, 1864November 10, 1864) was promoted to brigadier general.  Earlier in the war, he had served as captain of Co. D in the 4th Wisconsin Infantry, and was later major and lieutenant colonel of the regiment.
 Lt. Colonel Nelson F. Craigue (June 1864May 28, 1866) mustered out with the regiment.  He was designated for promotion to colonel, but was never mustered at that rank.

Notable people
 John W. Gunning was chief bugler of the regiment.  After the war he became a Wisconsin state legislator.
 Warren P. Knowles I, the grandfather of Warren P. Knowles III, was enlisted in Co. G and rose to the rank of captain.
 George Wilbur Peck was enlisted in Co. L and later commissioned 2nd lieutenant.  After the war, he was elected the 29th mayor of Milwaukee and the 17th Governor of Wisconsin.
 Joseph B. Reynolds was captain of Co. K.  After the war he became a Wisconsin state legislator.
 Arthur B. Richards, son of Daniel H. Richards, was enlisted in Co. L and died of disease at Baton Rouge.
 William Henry Young was enlisted in Co. H and was wounded at Port Hudson.  He was designated for commission as 1st lieutenant but was never mustered at that rank.  After the war he became a Wisconsin state legislator.

See also

 List of Wisconsin Civil War units
 Wisconsin in the American Civil War

References

External links
The Civil War Archive
The Official 4th Wisconsin Website

Military units and formations established in 1863
Military units and formations disestablished in 1866
Units and formations of the Union Army from Wisconsin
Military units and formations disestablished in 1865
1863 establishments in Wisconsin
1866 disestablishments in Wisconsin